Petteri Wirtanen (born May 28, 1986) is a Finnish professional ice hockey Forward currently playing with HC TPS in the Liiga. Wirtanen was selected 172nd overall in the 6th round of the 2006 NHL Entry Draft by the Anaheim Ducks.

Playing career
Wirtanen played as a youth within HPK. He made his professional debut with the club at the SM-liiga level during the 2004–05 season. In the following season he became a Finnish champion with HPK in 2006. He was signed to a three-year, entry-level contract with the Anaheim Ducks on July 27, 2006.

Wirtanen spent his first full North American season with the Ducks' American Hockey League affiliate, the Portland Pirates for the 2006–07 campaign. He recorded 7 goals and 18 points in 67 games. In the following season he made his NHL debut for the Ducks on October 17, 2007. Appearing in just 3 games for 1 goal.

At the conclusion of his rookie contract, Wirtanen opted to return to Finland in signing a multi-year contract with HIFK on July 28, 2009. He helped HIFK capture the Finnish Liiga title, his second, in 2011.

After stints with HC Donbass and HC Fribourg-Gottéron, Wirtanen returned to the KHL in signing an initial two-year contract with Finnish club, Jokerit, on November 14, 2014.

Career statistics

Regular season and playoffs

International

References

External links

1986 births
Living people
Anaheim Ducks draft picks
Anaheim Ducks players
Djurgårdens IF Hockey players
HC Donbass players
Finnish ice hockey centres
HC Fribourg-Gottéron players
HIFK (ice hockey) players
HPK players
Iowa Stars players
Jokerit players
People from Hyvinkää
Portland Pirates players
HC TPS players
Sportspeople from Uusimaa